Rasagiline (Azilect, Azipron) is an irreversible inhibitor of monoamine oxidase-B used as a monotherapy to treat symptoms in early Parkinson's disease or as an adjunct therapy in more advanced cases.

The racemic form of the drug was invented by Aspro Nicholas in the early 1970s. Moussa B.H. Youdim identified it as a potential drug for Parkinson's disease, and working with collaborators at  Technion – Israel Institute of Technology in Israel and the drug company, Teva Pharmaceuticals, identified the R-isomer as the active form of the drug. Teva brought it to market in partnership with Lundbeck in Europe and Eisai in the US and elsewhere. It was approved in Europe in 2005 and in the US in 2006.

Rasagiline is used to treat symptoms of Parkinson's disease both alone and in combination with other drugs. It has shown efficacy in both early and advanced Parkinsons, and appears to be especially useful in dealing with non-motor symptoms like fatigue.

Rasagiline has not been tested in pregnant women and is Pregnancy Category C in the US.

Side effects
The FDA label contains warnings that rasagiline may cause severe hypertension or hypotension, may make people sleepy, may make motor control worse in some people, may cause hallucinations and psychotic-like behavior, may cause impulse control disorder, may increase the risk of melanoma, and upon withdrawal may cause high fever or confusion.

Side effects when the drug is taken alone include flu-like symptoms, joint pain, depression, stomach upset, headache, dizziness, and insomnia. When taken with L-DOPA, side effects include increased movement problems, accidental injury, sudden drops in blood pressure,  joint pain and swelling, dry mouth, rash, abnormal dreams and digestive problems including vomiting, loss of appetite, weight loss, abdominal pain, nausea, constipation.  When taken with Parkinson's drugs other than L-DOPA, side effects include peripheral edema, fall, joint pain, cough, and insomnia.

Interactions 
People who are taking meperidine, tramadol, methadone, propoxyphene, dextromethorphan, St. John’s wort, cyclobenzaprine, or another  MAO inhibitor should not take rasagiline.

The FDA drug label carries a warning of the risk of serotonin syndrome when rasagiline is used with antidepressants or with meperidine.  However the risk appears to be low, based on a multicenter retrospective study in 1504 people, which looked for serotonin syndrome in people with PD who were treated with rasagiline plus antidepressants, rasagiline without antidepressants, or antidepressants plus Parkinson's drugs other than either rasagiline or selegiline; no cases were identified.

There is a risk of psychosis or bizarre behavior if rasagiline is used with dextromethorphan and there is a risk of non-selective MAO inhibition and hypertensive crisis if rasagiline is used with other MAO inhibitors.

Chemistry
Rasagiline is molecularly a propargylamine derivative.  The form brought to market by Teva and its partners is the mesylate salt, and was  designated chemically as: 1H-Inden-1-amine-2,3-dihydro-N-2-propynyl-(1R)-methanesulfonate.

Pharmacology

Mechanism of action

Parkinson's disease is characterized by the death of cells that produce dopamine, a neurotransmitter. An enzyme called monoamine oxidase (MAO) breaks down neurotransmitters.  MAO has two forms, MAO-A and MAO-B.  MAO-B is generally believed to break down  dopamine; however, recent evidence suggests that MAO-A may mostly or entirely be responsible for dopamine metabolism. Rasagiline prevents the breakdown of dopamine by irreversibly binding to MAO-B. Dopamine is therefore more available, somewhat compensating for the diminished quantities made in the brains of people with Parkinson's.

Selegiline was the first selective MAO-B inhibitor.  It is partly metabolized to levomethamphetamine (l-methamphetamine), one of the two enantiomers of methamphetamine, in vivo. While these metabolites may contribute to selegiline's ability to inhibit reuptake of the neurotransmitters dopamine and norepinephrine, they have also been associated with orthostatic hypotension and hallucinations in some people. Rasagiline metabolizes into 1(R)-aminoindan which has no amphetamine-like characteristics and has neuroprotective properties in cells and in animal models.

It is selective for MAO type B over type A by a factor of fourteen.

Metabolism
Rasagiline is broken down via CYP1A2, part of the cytochrome P450 metabolic path in the liver. It is contraindicated in patients with hepatic insufficiency and its use should be monitored carefully in patients taking other drugs that alter the normal effectiveness of this metabolic path.

History
Prior to the discovery of rasagiline, a closely related analog called SU-11739 (AGN 1133) was patented. At first, the N-methyl was necessary for the agent to be considered a ring cyclized analog of pargyline with ca. twenty-times the potency. However, the N-methyl compound was a non-selective MAOI.

Racemic rasagiline was discovered and patented by Aspro Nicholas in the 1970s as a drug candidate for treatment of hypertension.

Moussa B. H. Youdim, a biochemist, had been involved in developing selegiline as a drug for Parkinsons, in collaboration with Peter Reiderer.  He wanted to find a similar compound that would have fewer side effects, and around 1977, at about the same time he moved from London to Haifa to join the faculty of Technion, he noticed that rasagiline could potentially be such a compound. He called that compound, AGN 1135.

In 1996 Youdim, in collaboration with scientists from Technion and the US National Institutes of Health, and using compounds developed with Teva Pharmaceuticals, published a paper in which the authors wrote that they were inspired by the racemic nature of deprenyl and the greater activity of one of its stereoisomers, L-deprenyl, which became selegiline,  to explore the qualities of the isomers of the Aspro compound, and they found that the R-isomer had almost all the activity; this is the compound that became rasagiline.  They called the mesylate salt of the R-isomer TVP-1012 and the hydrochloride salt, TVP-101.

Teva and Technion filed patent applications for this racemically pure compound, methods to make it, and methods to use it to treat Parkinsons and other disorders, and Technion eventually assigned its rights to Teva.

Teva began development of rasagiline, and by 1999 was in Phase III trials, and entered into a partnership with Lundbeck in which Lundbeck agreed to share the costs and obtained the joint right to market the drug in Europe.  In 2003 Teva partnered with Eisai, giving Eisai the right to jointly market the drug for Parkinson's in the US, and to co-develop and co-market the drug for Alzheimers and other neurological diseases.

It was approved by the European Medicines Agency for Parkinson's in 2005 and in the US in 2006.

Research
Rasagiline was tested for efficacy in people with multiple system atrophy in a large randomized, placebo-controlled, double-blind disease-modification trial; the drug failed.

Teva conducted clinical trials attempting to prove that rasagiline did not just treat symptoms, but was a disease-modifying drug - that it actually prevented the death of the dopaminergic neurons that characterize Parkinson's disease and slowed disease progression.  They conducted two clinical trials, called TEMPO and ADAGIO, to try to prove this.  The FDA advisory committee rejected their claim in 2011, saying that the clinical trial results did not prove that rasagiline was neuroprotective. The main reason was that in one of the trials, the lower dose was effective at slowing progression, but the higher dose was not, and this made no sense in light of standard dose-response pharmacology.

See also 
 Selegiline
 Ladostigil

References

External links 
 
 

Nootropics
Monoamine oxidase inhibitors
Antiparkinsonian agents
1-Aminoindanes
Propargyl compounds
Orphan drugs